Suyash Jadhav is an Indian Para swimmer competing in the S7 Category. He is the only Indian Para swimmer to have achieved the ‘A’ qualifying mark for the  2016 Paralympics in Rio, and is being supported by the GoSports Foundation through the Para Champions Programme ahead of his Paralympics quest.

Career

Training at the Deccan Gymkhana in Pune, Jadhav won a silver and a bronze medal at the 2015 IWAS World Games in Sochi, Russia, conducted by the International Wheelchair and Amputee Sports Federation. In doing so, Suyash became the first Indian Para swimmer to register the ‘A’ qualifying mark for the 2016 Paralympics in Rio and Tokyo Olympics 2020.. Now taking training at Balewadi stadium.

He followed this up with four medals at the 2015 Winter Open Polish Championship in November and won three silver medals at the German swimming championship in 2016.

References

Living people
Paralympic swimmers of India
1993 births
Indian male swimmers
Swimmers at the 2016 Summer Paralympics
Swimmers from Maharashtra
Swimmers at the 2020 Summer Paralympics
S7-classified Paralympic swimmers
Swimmers at the 2022 Commonwealth Games
Commonwealth Games competitors for India
Recipients of the Arjuna Award
Medalists at the 2018 Asian Para Games